The 1984 Eastern Michigan Hurons football team represented Eastern Michigan University in the 1984 NCAA Division I-A football season. In their second season under head coach Jim Harkema, the Hurons compiled a 2–7–2 record (2–5–2 against conference opponents), finished in last place in the Mid-American Conference, and were outscored by their opponents, 221 to 151. The team's statistical leaders included Robert Gordon with 949 passing yards, Gary Patton with 566 rushing yards, and Derrin Powell with 261 receiving yards.

Schedule

References

Eastern Michigan
Eastern Michigan Eagles football seasons
Eastern Michigan Hurons football